Dame Ada May Norris, DBE, CMG (née Bickford; 28 July 1901–10 July 1989) was an Australian women's rights activist and community worker. She founded the UNAA National Status of Women Network in 1974 and served as President of Australia's National Council of Women. In 1975 Norris headed the Australian International Women's Year Committee.

Education
Ada May Bickford was educated at Melbourne High School and the University of Melbourne, where she graduated in 1924 (BA Dip. Ed.).

Marriage
In 1929, she married John Gerald Norris (1903-1990), a future Victoria Supreme Court jurist, later styled as Sir John Norris; they had two daughters, Rosemary (born 1933) and Jane (born 1938).

Rosemary would later be known as the Hon. Rosemary Balmford, a
barrister, lawyer, law lecturer and judge. Jane completed architecture at the University of Melbourne, worked extensively in Theatre and film production design in the UK and became head of Design at the Australian Film, Television and Radio School (AFTRS; 1988-1994).

Honours
 Awarded the Queen Elizabeth II Coronation Medal 1953
 Ada Norris was appointed OBE on 10 June 1954
 Appointed DBE on 12 June 1976 "for distinguished community service".
 Appointed a CMG (in her capacity as President of Australia's National Council of Women)
 Awarded the Queen Elizabeth II Silver Jubilee Medal 1977
 Awarded the UN Peace Medal 1975

References

External links
Monash University archives
Victoria, Australia government archives site

1901 births
1989 deaths
Australian Dames Commander of the Order of the British Empire
Australian Companions of the Order of St Michael and St George
Activists from Melbourne
University of Melbourne alumni
20th-century Australian women